Nicolas Wettstein (born 30 March 1981) is an Ecuadorian Olympic eventing rider. He competed at the 2016 Summer Olympics in Rio de Janeiro in the individual competition, but failed to complete the cross-country phase. He then qualified to represent Ecuador at the 2020 Summer Olympics. Riding Altier d'Aurois, he improved on his Rio performance, and eventually placed 41st.

Wettstein also participated at the 2014 World Equestrian Games and at the 2015 Pan American Games. He finished 4th in the team eventing competition at the 2015 Pan Am Games held in Toronto, Canada.

International Championship Results

References

Living people
1981 births
Sportspeople from Basel-Stadt
Ecuadorian male equestrians
Equestrians at the 2016 Summer Olympics
Olympic equestrians of Ecuador
Equestrians at the 2015 Pan American Games
Pan American Games competitors for Ecuador
Equestrians at the 2020 Summer Olympics
21st-century Ecuadorian people